Spanish mythology refers to the sacred myths of the cultures of Spain. They also include the myths and religions of the Celts, Celtiberians, Iberians, Milesians, Carthaginians, Suebi, Visigoths, Spaniards and Roman and Greek mythology.

See also
Cuento
Legend of la Encantada
Christian mythology

 (Guanche mythology)

External links
 Cantabria joven mitología